Groom Lake is a dry lake, also described as a salt flat, in Nevada. It is used for runways of the Nellis Bombing Range Test Site airport (KXTA).

The nearest publicly accessible vantage point is Tikaboo Peak, 26 miles to the east. There were two closer vantage points, dubbed "Freedom Ridge" and "White Sides", but they were closed to public access in 1995 to prevent people from taking pictures of the installation.

History

Lead and silver were discovered in the southern part of the Groom Range in 1864, and the English Groome Lead Mines Limited company financed the Conception Mines in the 1870s, giving the district its name (nearby mines included Maria, Willow and White Lake). The mining claims in Groom were acquired by J. B. Osborne and partners and patented in 1876, and Osborne's son acquired the interests in the 1890s. The claims were proved in 1916 when two companies began working their mines; that work continued until 1918, and resuming after World War II until the early 1950s.

In popular culture
In the Call of Duty: Black Ops franchise's Zombies mode, Groom Lake appears repeatedly as a test site for the American government's experiments with lunar teleportation.

References

Lakes of Nevada
Lakes of Lincoln County, Nevada
Mining in Nevada
Salt flats of the United States